Lough na Glack is a lake in County Monaghan, Ireland.

References

Glack